On the morning of 15 May 2011, on Nakba Day, a terrorist attack was carried out in Tel Aviv. A truck was deliberately rammed into cars and pedestrians at busy "Bar-Lev" street (Highway 461) in the south of the city, killing one man and injuring 17 others. The truck driver was identified as Aslam Ibrahim Isa, a 22-year-old Arab-Israeli man from the city of Kfar Kassem. Immediately after the attack he was arrested and taken to questioning by police.

Around 9:35 a.m., beginning at "Mesubim" junction and for 2 kilometers (1.2 miles), Isa shouted "Allahu Akbar!" as he hit with his truck multiple cars, buses, traffic signs, security rails, and people. Police said a total of 15 vehicles were hit during the attack. Aviv Morag, a 29-year-old man from Givatayim, was killed. The ramming attack ended when the truck crashed into an empty bus near a school. Isa then left the truck and reportedly shouted and threw objects at people. He hit a young girl in the head with a traffic light. He was arrested by police, and later sentenced to prison. 

This was one of a small cluster of terrorist vehicle-ramming attacks in Israel in this period, including the 2008 Jerusalem bulldozer attack, the 2008 Jerusalem BMW attack and the 2011 Tel Aviv nightclub attack.

See also
 2011 Tel Aviv nightclub attack
 Vehicular assault as a terrorist tactic

References

Terrorist incidents in Israel in 2011
Terrorist incidents involving vehicular attacks
February 2011 events in Asia
2011 murders in Israel
2010s crimes in Tel Aviv